Mohsen Ashouri (born January 2, 1965) is a retired Iranian football player and a current coach.

Honours

Club
Persepolis
Iranian Football League (2): 1995-96, 1996-97
Asian Cup Winners' Cup (1): 1990–91
Hazfi Cup (2): 1987–88, 1991–92
Tehran Clubs Championship League (3): 1987–88, 1989–90, 1990–91

National
Iran
Asian Games Gold Medal (1): 1990

References

 Haddadpour, Mehdi; Zarei, Asghar. Persepolis F.C. Official pictorial lexicon and Yearbook of 2007–2008. Honarkade Khojaste

1965 births
Living people
Iranian footballers
Iran international footballers
Iranian expatriate footballers
Persepolis F.C. players
Asian Games gold medalists for Iran
Persepolis F.C. non-playing staff
Asian Games medalists in football
Footballers at the 1990 Asian Games
1992 AFC Asian Cup players
Association football wingers
Medalists at the 1990 Asian Games
People from Nowshahr
Sportspeople from Mazandaran province
21st-century Iranian people